Jerrold Robertshaw (28 March 1866, in Allerton, West Riding of Yorkshire – 14 February 1941, in London) was a British stage and film actor of the silent era.

Selected filmography
 Dombey and Son (1917)
 Build Thy House (1920)
 The Bonnie Brier Bush (1921)
 A Master of Craft (1922)
 The Wandering Jew (1923)
 Should a Doctor Tell?  (1923)
 A Royal Divorce (1923)
 Guy Fawkes (1923)
 Don Quixote (1923)
 The Arab (1924)
 The Sins Ye Do (1924)
 She (1925)
 The Apache (1925)
 A Royal Divorce (1926)
 Huntingtower (1927)
 Tommy Atkins (1928)
 Bolibar (1928)
 You Know What Sailors Are (1928)
 Palais de danse (1928)
 Glorious Youth (1929)
 Power Over Men (1929)
 The Inseparables (1929)
 The Shadow Between (1931)
 The Veteran of Waterloo (1933)

References

External links

1866 births
1941 deaths
20th-century English male actors
English male film actors
English male silent film actors
English male stage actors
Male actors from Bradford